Henry Ogier (4 December 1864 – 29 November 1954) was a New Zealand cricketer. He played in five first-class matches for Canterbury from 1889 to 1892.

See also
 List of Canterbury representative cricketers

References

External links
 

1864 births
1954 deaths
New Zealand cricketers
Canterbury cricketers
Cricketers from Christchurch